The 1991 Stanley Cup Playoffs for the National Hockey League (NHL) championship began on April 3, 1991, following the 1990–91 regular season. The 16 teams that qualified, from the top four teams of the four divisions, played best-of-seven series with re-seeding after the division finals. The Conference Champions played a best-of-seven series for the Stanley Cup.

This was the first of the 25 consecutive years in which the Detroit Red Wings qualified for the Stanley Cup playoffs until their streak finally ended in 2017. Their streak is tied for the third longest in NHL history, and while it was running, it was the longest active playoff appearance streak in the four major American professional sports.

The finals concluded on May 25 with the Pittsburgh Penguins winning the Stanley Cup, defeating the Minnesota North Stars in the final series four games to two. Pittsburgh forward Mario Lemieux was awarded the Conn Smythe Trophy as Most Valuable Player of the playoffs.

This was the first NHL playoffs without any series sweeps since the 1973 playoffs. In addition, this season set the record for most playoff games played with 92, which stood until 2014.

Playoff seeds
In the 1990–91 season, teams qualified based on their division standing at the end of the regular season. Playoffs then proceeded among the top four teams in each division, providing a division winner. The two division winners of each conference then played off to provide a conference winner. The two conference winners then played in the Finals to produce a Stanley Cup champion.

The following teams qualified for the playoffs:

Prince of Wales Conference

Adams Division
 Boston Bruins, Adams Division champions, Prince of Wales Conference regular season champions – 100 points
 Montreal Canadiens – 89 points
 Buffalo Sabres – 81 points
 Hartford Whalers – 73 points

Patrick Division
 Pittsburgh Penguins, Patrick Division champions – 88 points
 New York Rangers – 85 points
 Washington Capitals – 81 points
 New Jersey Devils – 79 points

Clarence Campbell Conference

Norris Division
 Chicago Blackhawks, Norris Division champions, Clarence Campbell Conference regular season champions, Presidents' Trophy winners – 106 points
 St. Louis Blues – 105 points
 Detroit Red Wings – 76 points
 Minnesota North Stars – 68 points

Smythe Division
 Los Angeles Kings, Smythe Division champions – 102 points
 Calgary Flames – 100 points
 Edmonton Oilers – 80 points
 Vancouver Canucks – 65 points

Playoff bracket

Division Semifinals

Prince of Wales Conference

(A1) Boston Bruins vs. (A4) Hartford Whalers
This was the second playoff meeting between these two teams. This was a rematch of last year's Adams Division Semifinals in which Boston won in seven games.

(A2) Montreal Canadiens vs. (A3) Buffalo Sabres
This was fifth playoff series between these two teams, and were meeting for the second straight year. Both teams split their previous four playoff meetings. Montreal won last year's Adams Division Semifinals in six games.

(P1) Pittsburgh Penguins vs. (P4) New Jersey Devils
This was the first playoff meeting between these two teams.

(P2) New York Rangers vs. (P3) Washington Capitals
This was the third playoff series meeting between these two teams, and were meeting for the second straight year. Both teams split the previous two meetings. Washington won last year's Patrick Division Finals in five games.

Clarence Campbell Conference

(N1) Chicago Blackhawks vs. (N4) Minnesota North Stars
This was the sixth playoff meeting between these two teams and were meeting for the second straight year. Chicago won four of the previous five playoff meetings, including last year's Norris Division Semifinals in seven games.

(N2) St. Louis Blues vs. (N3) Detroit Red Wings
This was the third playoff meeting between these two teams. Both teams split the previous two meetings. Detroit won their most recent meeting in five games in the 1988 Norris Division Finals.

(S1) Los Angeles Kings vs. (S4) Vancouver Canucks
This was the second playoff meeting between these two teams. Vancouver won the only prior meeting in five games in the 1982 Smythe Division Finals.

(S2) Calgary Flames vs. (S3) Edmonton Oilers
This was the fifth playoff meeting between these two rivals with Edmonton winning three of the four previous series. They last met in the 1988 Smythe Division Finals, which Edmonton won in a four-game sweep. These teams did not meet again in the playoffs until 2022.

Division Finals

Prince of Wales Conference

(A1) Boston Bruins vs. (A2) Montreal Canadiens
This was the eighth straight and 26th overall playoff meeting between these two teams. Montreal lead the all-time meetings 21–4. Boston won last year's Adams Division Finals in five games.

(P1) Pittsburgh Penguins vs. (P3) Washington Capitals
This was the first playoff meeting between these two teams.

Clarence Campbell Conference

(N2) St. Louis Blues vs. (N4) Minnesota North Stars
This was the ninth playoff series between these two teams, and the last one before the North Stars relocated to Dallas. St. Louis won five of the previous eight playoff series, including the most recent one in five games in the 1989 Norris Division Semifinals.

(S1) Los Angeles Kings vs. (S3) Edmonton Oilers
This was the third straight and sixth overall playoff meeting between these two teams. Edmonton won three of the previous five meetings, including last year's Smythe Division Finals in a four-game sweep.

Conference Finals

Prince of Wales Conference Final

(A1) Boston Bruins vs. (P1) Pittsburgh Penguins
This was the third playoff series between these two teams. Boston won both previous series in consecutive years, with Boston winning the most recent series 3–2 in the 1980 Preliminary Round. Boston made their second consecutive and fourth overall Conference Finals appearance; they defeated the Washington Capitals the previous year in a four-game sweep. This was the first conference final for Pittsburgh since the playoffs went to a conference format starting in 1982. Pittsburgh last played a semifinal series in 1970 where they lost to the St. Louis Blues in six games. These teams split their three-game regular season series.

Clarence Campbell Conference Final

(S3) Edmonton Oilers vs. (N4) Minnesota North Stars

This was the second playoff series between these two teams. Edmonton won the only previous meeting in a four-game sweep in the 1984 Campbell Conference Final. Edmonton made their second consecutive and seventh appearance in the Conference Finals; they defeated the Chicago Blackhawks the previous year in six games. Minnesota made their second Conference Finals appearance; they last made it to the Conference Finals in 1984, when they were swept by the Oilers in four straight. Minnesota won this year's three-game regular season series earning five of six points. Minnesota's series victory was the first time since realignment in 1981 that the Clarence Campbell Conference was not represented by a Canadian or Smythe Division team in the Stanley Cup Finals, and the first time since 1982 it was not represented by an Albertan team.

Stanley Cup Finals

This was the first playoff series between these two teams.

Playoff statistics

Skaters
These are the top ten skaters based on points.

Goaltenders
This is a combined table of the top five goaltenders based on goals against average and the top five goaltenders based on save percentage, with at least 420 minutes played. The table is sorted by GAA, and the criteria for inclusion are bolded.

See also
1990–91 NHL season
List of NHL seasons

References

playoffs
Stanley Cup playoffs